The boa catshark (Scyliorhinus boa) is a catshark of the family Scyliorhinidae. It is found on the continental shelves and insular slopes of the Caribbean Sea and the Gulf of Mexico, between latitudes 20° N and 9° N, at depths between 330 and 675 m.  It can grow up to a length of 54 cm. The reproduction of this catshark is oviparous.

Description
The front nasal flaps do not extend as far as the mouth, which has grooves on the lower lip only, and there are no nasoral grooves. The first dorsal fin has its origin just behind the rear end of the pelvic fin; there is a wide gap between it and the second dorsal fin, which is much smaller and has its origin above the posterior part of the pelvic fin. The skin is only slightly rough and the placoid scales are small. The background colour of the dorsal surface and flanks is pale yellowish-brown. The markings consist of a number of rather indistinct rectangular grey patches and saddles which are outlined with small black spots. Other black spots sometimes form net-like rows but these are seldom superimposed on the grey patches. There is sometimes a scattering of white spots also.

Distribution

Ecology
This catshark has been little studied. It is oviparous, laying a pair of eggs, with the embryos feeding on the yolk as they develop.

Status
As a deepwater species, the boa catshark lives below the depths at which commercial trawling takes place in the Caribbean region. The fish does not seem to face any particular threats and the International Union for Conservation of Nature has assessed its conservation status as being of "least concern".

References

boa catshark
Fish of the Caribbean
Fish of the Dominican Republic
Least concern biota of North America
Taxa named by George Brown Goode
Taxa named by Tarleton Hoffman Bean
boa catshark